"Crystal Japan" is an instrumental piece written by David Bowie and released as a single in Japan in spring 1980. It was recorded during the Scary Monsters sessions that year.  The instrumental was used in a Japanese commercial for the shochu Crystal Jun Rock, which also featured an appearance by Bowie, although he said at the time that the track was not specifically written for this purpose. Originally titled "Fuji Moto San", it was apparently intended to close the Scary Monsters album until replaced by "It's No Game (No. 2)".

Track listing
 "Crystal Japan" (David Bowie) – 3:08
 "Alabama Song" (Bertolt Brecht, Kurt Weill) – 3:51

Other releases
 The instrumental was released as the B-side to the single "Up the Hill Backwards" in March 1981. "Teenage Wildlife" was originally slated as the B-side for "Up the Hill Backwards" until Bowie found out the prices fans were paying for the import single of "Crystal Japan", and insisted the track receive a UK release.
 In 1992, the piece was released as a bonus track on the Rykodisc reissue of the album Scary Monsters (And Super Creeps).
 "Crystal Japan" also appeared on the compilations Rare (1982) and All Saints (2001), and on Re:Call 3, part of the A New Career in a New Town (1977–1982) boxed set (2017).
 Trent Reznor of Nine Inch Nails took the melody of "Crystal Japan" and used it as the basis for the track "A Warm Place", released on their 1994 album The Downward Spiral. Bowie's official website later said the two songs were so similar that "A Warm Place" was "a thinly-veiled cover" of "Crystal Japan".

Notes

References
 Pegg, Nicholas, The Complete David Bowie, Reynolds & Hearn Ltd, 2000,

External links

1980 singles
1980s instrumentals
David Bowie songs
Rock instrumentals
Songs written by David Bowie
RCA Records singles
1980 songs